La Promesse is a 1996 drama film by the Belgian brothers Luc Dardenne and Jean-Pierre Dardenne. The plot involves a father, Roger, who mercilessly trafficks and exploits undocumented immigrants. His son, Igor, is fifteen and an apprentice mechanic, who also works for his father in his labor contracting operation. When one of their illegal workers is seriously injured at the worksite, left to die, and the death concealed by Roger and Igor, a guilt-ridden Igor must choose between his father's chosen way of life and his promise to the dying man.

Cast
Jérémie Renier as Igor
Olivier Gourmet as Roger
Assita Ouedraogo as Assita

Critical response
La Promesse received overwhelmingly positive reviews from critics. Review aggregation website Rotten Tomatoes gives it a 95% approval rating, based on 21 reviews, with an average score of 7.8/10. At Metacritic, which assigns a normalized rating out of 100 to reviews from mainstream critics, the film received an average score of 82, based on 17 reviews, indicating "universal acclaim ".

Awards and nominations
Belgian Film Critics Association (Belgium)
Won: André Cavens Award for Best Film
Nominated: Grand Prix
César Awards (France)
Nominated: Best Foreign Film
Los Angeles Film Critics (USA)
Nominated: Best Foreign Film
National Society of Film Critics (USA)
Won: Best Foreign Language Film
Online Film Critics Society Awards (USA)
Nominated: Best Foreign Language Film
Satellite Awards (USA)
Nominated: Best Motion Picture – Foreign Language
Valladolid Film Festival (Spain)
Won: FIPRESCI Prize (Jean-Pierre and Luc Dardenne)
Won: Golden Spike (Jean-Pierre and Luc Dardenne)

References

External links

 
La Promesse at dardenne-brothers.com
La promesse: One Plus One an essay by Kent Jones at the Criterion Collection

1996 films
1990s French-language films
1996 drama films
Belgian drama films
French drama films
Films directed by the Dardenne brothers
Films shot in Belgium
Films set in Belgium
Belgium in fiction
Films about illegal immigration to Europe
French-language Belgian films
1990s French films